The sanjak of Najd was a sanjak (second-level province) of the Ottoman Empire. The name is considered misleading, as it covered the al-Hasa region, rather than the much larger Najd region. It was part of Baghdad Vilayet from June 1871 to 1875, when it became part of the Basra Vilayet.

The mutasarrif was located in Hofuf, which was garrisoned by up to 600 men, the largest Ottoman force in the area.

History
The opening of the Suez Canal in 1869 gave a new strategic importance to this region, stoking Ottoman interests in establishing effective control as a result of the revival of trade. In 1871, Midhat Pasha invaded al-Hasa and restored Ottoman control. When he incorporated this desert region into the Ottoman realm, Midhat Pasha had granted the local notables complete exemptions from taxation, except for the zakat.

In 1872 Qatar was designated a kaza under the Sanjak of the Najd. In March 1893, at the Battle of Al Wajbah (10 miles west of Doha), Shaikh Jassim bin Mohammed Al Thani defeated the Ottomans. Although Qatar did not gain full independence, the result of the battle forced a treaty that would later form the basis of Qatar emerging as an autonomous separate country within the empire.

The sultan recognized Abdullah II Al-Sabah as the kaymakam of Kuwait as a subprovince of al-Ahsa, formally acknowledging that Kuwait was a part of the Ottoman Empire and that it was ruled by the Sabah family.

In 1899, Shaikh Mubarak concluded a treaty with Britain, stipulating that Britain would protect Kuwait against any external aggression, de facto turning it into a British protectorate. Despite the Kuwaiti government's desire to either be independent or under British rule, the British concurred with the Ottoman Empire in defining Kuwait as an autonomous caza of the Ottoman Empire. This would last until World War I.  

In 1913 Ibn Saud launched an attack on Hofuf, where 1,200 Turkish troops had been stationed since the province's annexation in 1871. The Ottoman garrison was expelled from Hasa, and the territory fell to the Al Saud. Even after the conquest of Hasa, Britain considered Ibn Saud to be an Ottoman vassal, and the Anglo-Ottoman Convention of 1913 defined the boundaries of the sanjak of Najd, neither objecting to nor recognising Ibn Saud's conquest. This situation was dramatically changed by the outbreak of World War I, and on 26 December 1915 Britain recognised Najd, Hasa, Qatif and Jubail as Saudi possessions, as part of the Anglo-Saudi Treaty.

Administrative divisions
Kazas of the sanjak in 1896:
 Hofuf
 Qatif
 Qatar

Governors
 Sayyid Talib al-Naqib (1902-1904)

References

Ottoman Arabia
Ottoman period in Qatar
Najd